Anaerovorax is a  Gram-positive, non-sporeforming, strictly anaerobic, chemoorganotrophic bacterial genus from the family of Eubacteriaceae with one known species (Anaerovorax odorimutans).

References

Clostridiaceae
Bacteria genera
Monotypic bacteria genera